George Mannings (13 October 1843 – 28 November 1876) was an English first-class cricketer and medical doctor.

The son of George Mannings senior, he was born in October 1843 at Downton, Wiltshire and was educated at Marlborough College. After completing his education, Mannings became a surgeon for the Peninsular and Oriental Steam Navigation Company (P&O). He played first-class cricket for Hampshire against Middlesex at Islington in 1864, in what was only Hampshire's second first-class match. In a match which Middlesex won by an innings and 38 runs, Mannings was run out for 2 runs in Hampshire's first-innings, while in their second-innings he was dismissed for 5 runs by William Catling. Mannings died at Downton in November 1876.

References

External links

1843 births
1876 deaths
People from Downton, Wiltshire
People educated at Marlborough College
English cricketers
Hampshire cricketers
19th-century English medical doctors
Ship's doctors